Phyllanthus societatis is a species of flowering plant in the family Phyllanthaceae, native to Nauru, the Cook Islands and the Tuamotus, in the Pacific Ocean. The species was first described in 1866 by Johannes Müller Argoviensis.

References

societatis
Flora of Nauru
Flora of the Cook Islands
Flora of the Tuamotus
Plants described in 1866
Taxa named by Johannes Müller Argoviensis